Jackie Patea-Fereti (born 30 September 1986) is a New Zealand rugby union player. She played 18 tests for the Black Ferns between 2012 and 2019. She was a member of the 2014 Rugby World Cup squad in France. She also plays for Hurricanes Poua in the Super Rugby Aupiki competition and represents Wellington provincially.

Rugby career 
Patea-Fereti made her Black Ferns test debut against England on 23 November 2012. She was selected in the New Zealand squad for the 2014 Women's Rugby World Cup.

Patea-Fereti was recalled into the Black Ferns squad in 2018 and featured in their two test matches against Australia. In November, she also played in two test matches against France.

Patea-Fereti signed with the Hurricanes for the inaugural Super Rugby Aupiki season in 2022. She was named 2023 Hurricanes Poua captain for the second season.

References

External links 

 Black Ferns Profile

1986 births
Living people
New Zealand women's international rugby union players
New Zealand female rugby union players